Matylda Vilma Pálfyová (11 March 1912 – 23 September 1944) was a Slovak gymnast who competed in the 1936 Summer Olympics, helping her team to a silver medal. She also competed at the 1938 World Artistic Gymnastics Championships, where she won the bronze medal in the all-around competition.

She was born in Kostoľany nad Hornádom, Košice-okolie District, and died after falling from a horse and fracturing her skull in Veľké Brestovany at the age of 32.

References

External links
 profile

1912 births
1944 deaths
Czechoslovak female artistic gymnasts
Slovak female artistic gymnasts
Olympic gymnasts of Czechoslovakia
Gymnasts at the 1936 Summer Olympics
Olympic silver medalists for Czechoslovakia
Olympic medalists in gymnastics
People from Košice-okolie District
Sportspeople from the Košice Region
Medalists at the 1936 Summer Olympics
Deaths by horse-riding accident
Accidental deaths in Slovakia